Inger Jarl Beck (born 1948) is a Swedish social democratic politician. She has been a member of the Riksdag since 2006. She was a substitute from 2002 to 2006.

External links
Inger Jarl Beck at the Riksdag website

Members of the Riksdag from the Social Democrats
Living people
1948 births
Women members of the Riksdag
Members of the Riksdag 2002–2006
21st-century Swedish women politicians